The Kerch Constituency (No. 20) is a Russian legislative constituency in the Republic of Crimea. The constituency covers Central and Eastern Crimea.

Members elected

Election results

2016

|-
! colspan=2 style="background-color:#E9E9E9;text-align:left;vertical-align:top;" |Candidate
! style="background-color:#E9E9E9;text-align:left;vertical-align:top;" |Party
! style="background-color:#E9E9E9;text-align:right;" |Votes
! style="background-color:#E9E9E9;text-align:right;" |%
|-
|style="background-color:"|
|align=left|Konstantin Bakharev
|align=left|United Russia
|167,896
|70.46%
|-
|style="background-color:"|
|align=left|Igor Kiyko
|align=left|Liberal Democratic Party
|17,100
|7.18%
|-
|style="background-color:"|
|align=left|Stepan Kiskin
|align=left|Communist Party
|12,285
|5.16%
|-
|style="background:;"| 
|align=left|Valery Alekseyev
|align=left|Communists of Russia
|11,608
|4.87%
|-
|style="background-color:"|
|align=left|Mikhail Voropay
|align=left|A Just Russia
|7,359
|3.09%
|-
|style="background-color:"|
|align=left|Andrey Pasha
|align=left|Rodina
|6,834
|2.87%
|-
|style="background:"| 
|align=left|Rustem Emirov
|align=left|The Greens
|6,265
|2.63%
|-
|style="background:"| 
|align=left|Yury Pershikov
|align=left|Patriots of Russia
|1,238
|0.52%
|-
|style="background:;"| 
|align=left|Aleksandr Svistunov
|align=left|Party of Growth
|1,199
|0.50%
|-
| colspan="5" style="background-color:#E9E9E9;"|
|- style="font-weight:bold"
| colspan="3" style="text-align:left;" | Total
| 238,271
| 100%
|-
| colspan="5" style="background-color:#E9E9E9;"|
|- style="font-weight:bold"
| colspan="4" |Source:
|
|}

2021

|-
! colspan=2 style="background-color:#E9E9E9;text-align:left;vertical-align:top;" |Candidate
! style="background-color:#E9E9E9;text-align:left;vertical-align:top;" |Party
! style="background-color:#E9E9E9;text-align:right;" |Votes
! style="background-color:#E9E9E9;text-align:right;" |%
|-
|style="background-color:"|
|align=left|Konstantin Bakharev (incumbent)
|align=left|United Russia
|153,043
|63.59%
|-
|style="background-color:"|
|align=left|Nikolay Volkov
|align=left|Liberal Democratic Party
|16,225
|6.74%
|-
|style="background-color:"|
|align=left|Viktor Kudryashov
|align=left|Communist Party
|14,379
|5.97%
|-
|style="background-color:"|
|align=left|Yekaterina Pitina
|align=left|New People
|13,697
|5.69%
|-
|style="background-color:"|
|align=left|Oleg Severnenko
|align=left|A Just Russia — For Truth
|11,625
|4.83%
|-
|style="background-color:"|
|align=left|Artur Travin
|align=left|Party of Pensioners
|7,135
|2.96%
|-
|style="background:;"| 
|align=left|Aleksandr Turov
|align=left|Communists of Russia
|6,500
|2.70%
|-
|style="background-color:"|
|align=left|Artyom Dubovik
|align=left|Rodina
|4,185
|1.74%
|-
|style="background:"| 
|align=left|Vladimir Pastukhov
|align=left|The Greens
|3,760
|1.56%
|-
| colspan="5" style="background-color:#E9E9E9;"|
|- style="font-weight:bold"
| colspan="3" style="text-align:left;" | Total
| 240,660
| 100%
|-
| colspan="5" style="background-color:#E9E9E9;"|
|- style="font-weight:bold"
| colspan="4" |Source:
|
|}

References

Russian legislative constituencies
Politics of Crimea